This is a list of episodes of the South Korean variety-music show King of Mask Singer in 2018. The show airs on MBC as part of their Sunday Night lineup. The names listed below are in performance order.

 – Contestant is instantly eliminated by the live audience and judging panel
 – After being eliminated, contestant performs a prepared song for the next round and takes off their mask during the instrumental break
 – After being eliminated and revealing their identity, contestant has another special performance.
 – Contestant advances to the next round.
 – Contestant becomes the challenger.
 – Mask King.

Episodes

68th Generation Mask King

Contestants: , Ahn Young-mi, Solbin (Laboum), Seungkwan (Seventeen),  (Click-B), 

Episode 135

Episode 135 was broadcast on January 7, 2018. This marks the beginning of the Sixty-eighth Generation.

Episode 136

Episode 136 was broadcast on January 14, 2018.

69th Generation Mask King

Contestants: Shownu (Monsta X), Kang Sung-jin, Kim Min-seok (MeloMance), Eunjung (T-ara), Kyulkyung (Pristin), Jo Kwon (2AM), 

Episode 137

Episode 137 was broadcast on January 21, 2018. This marks the beginning of the Sixty-ninth Generation.

Episode 138

Episode 138 was broadcast on January 28, 2018.

70th Generation Mask King

Contestants: Juniel, Kim Ji-soo, Shin Hyun-soo, Yoo Seul-gi (Duetto), Ju-ne (iKON), JooE (Momoland), Ivy, Park Joon-hyung

Episode 139

Episode 139 was broadcast on February 4, 2018. This marks the beginning of the Seventieth Generation.

Episode 140

Episode 140 was broadcast on February 11, 2018. Due to broadcast of 2018 Winter Olympics before, this episode was late aired starting 18:15 (KST) by using the timeframe of Wizard of Nowhere.

71st Generation Mask King

Contestants: Gilgu, Lee Soo-min, Hui (Pentagon), Oh Seung-yoon, Son Seung-yeon, 

Episode 141

Episode 141 was broadcast on February 18, 2018. This marks the beginning of the Seventy-first Generation.

Episode 142

Episode 142 was broadcast on February 25, 2018.

72nd Generation Mask King

Episode 143

Episode 143 was broadcast on March 4, 2018. This marks the beginning of the Seventy-second Generation.

Episode 144

Episode 144 was broadcast on March 11, 2018.

73rd Generation Mask King

Contestants: Kim Kyu-jong (SS501/Double S 301), Cheeze, Jundoy, Dongwoo (INFINITE), Jinsol (April)

Episode 145

Episode 145 was broadcast on March 18, 2018. This marks the beginning of the Seventy-third Generation.

Episode 146

Episode 146 was broadcast on March 25, 2018.

74th Generation Mask King

Episode 147

Episode 147 was broadcast on April 1, 2018. This marks the beginning of the Seventy-fourth Generation.

Episode 148

Episode 148 was broadcast on April 8, 2018.

75th Generation Mask King

Contestants: Babylon, Michelle Lee, Hoya, Lim Na-young of Pristin, Kim Jae-hwan (singer) of Wanna One

Episode 149

Episode 149 was broadcast on April 15, 2018. This marks the beginning of the Seventy-fifth Generation.

Episode 150

Episode 150 was broadcast on April 22, 2018.

76th Generation Mask King

Contestants: Jeonghwa (EXID), Paul Kim, Hwang Seok-jeong, High.D (Sonamoo), Lee Jun-young (entertainer) (U-KISS/UNB), Kim Chang-yeol (DJ Doc), 

Episode 151

Episode 151 was broadcast on April 29, 2018. This marks the beginning of the Seventy-sixth Generation.

Episode 152

Episode 152 was broadcast on May 6, 2018.

77th Generation Mask King

Contestants: Joochan (Golden Child), Ji Se-hee , Hoshi (South Korean singer) of Seventeen (South Korean band), Hanhae, Park Seung-il (Ulala Session), Kim Ye-won (Jewelry), 

Episode 153

Episode 153 was broadcast on May 13, 2018. This marks the beginning of the Seventy-seventh Generation.

Episode 154

Episode 154 was broadcast on May 20, 2018.

78th Generation Mask King

Episode 155

Episode 155 was broadcast on May 27, 2018. This marks the beginning of the Seventy-eighth Generation.

Episode 156

Episode 156 was broadcast on June 3, 2018.

79th Generation Mask King

Contestants: Shin Hyun-hee (Seenroot), Jin (Lovelyz), Ha Sung-woon (Wanna One/Hotshot), Kang Doo, Park Kyung (Block B), Kim Gyu-ri, Han Dong-geun

Episode 157

Episode 157 was broadcast on June 10, 2018. This marks the beginning of the Seventy-ninth Generation.

Episode 158

Episode 158 was broadcast on June 17, 2018.

80th Generation Mask King

Contestants: Cho Jun-ho, Kangnam, Baekho (NU'EST), Kim Jun-hyun, Killagramz, Kim Soo-yeon , Hyejeong (AOA)

Episode 159

Episode 159 was broadcast on June 24, 2018. This marks the beginning of the Eightieth Generation.

Episode 160

Episode 160 was broadcast on July 1, 2018.

81st Generation Mask King

Contestants: , Lee Sang-gon (Noel), Jessi, Euna Kim, Hyomin (T-ara), Lee Yong-jin, Woohyun (INFINITE), Sung Hyuk

Episode 161

Episode 161 was broadcast on July 8, 2018. This marks the beginning of the Eighty-first Generation.

Episode 162

Episode 162 was broadcast on July 15, 2018.

82nd Generation Mask King

Contestants: Binnie (Oh My Girl), David Oh, Seungri (Big Bang), Rowoon (SF9), Solji (EXID), Park Kyung-lim

Episode 163

Episode 163 was broadcast on July 22, 2018. This marks the beginning of the Eighty-second Generation.

Episode 164

Episode 164 was broadcast on July 29, 2018.

83rd Generation Mask King

Contestants: Ji Sang-ryeol, Yoon Hee-seok, Skull, Lee Tae-ri, Kim Tae-hyung (Click-B), Sunye (Wonder Girls), Kim Do-yeon (singer) (Weki Meki)

Episode 165

Episode 165 was broadcast on August 5, 2018. This marks the beginning of the Eighty-third Generation.

Episode 166

Episode 166 was broadcast on August 12, 2018.

84th Generation Mask King

Contestants: Jinhwan (iKON), Kriesha Chu, MC Gree, Jooyoung, Im Hyung-joon, 

Episode 167

Episode 167 was broadcast on September 2, 2018. This marks the beginning of the Eighty-fourth Generation.

Episode 168

Episode 168 was broadcast on September 9, 2018.

King of Mask Singer – "The Winners"
Former Mask Kings/Queens: Johan Kim, Sohyang, Jung Dong-ha, Hwanhee (Fly to the Sky), Sunwoo Jung-a, Kim Yeon-ji

This special program was a part of 2018 DMC Festival which was taken place at Sangam Culture Square on September 7, 2018, featured few former Mask Kings/Queens and other special guests' performances. It was re-aired on television with subtitles on September 16, 2018 in one episode.

85th Generation Mask King

Contestants: Ha Joon-seok (Ulala Session), Jung Tae-woo, Paul Potts, Nicole Jung, Lyn, Nayoung (Gugudan)

Episode 169

Episode 169 was broadcast on September 16, 2018. This marks the beginning of the Eighty-fifth Generation.

Episode 170

Episode 170 was broadcast on September 23, 2018.

86th Generation Mask King

Contestants: Sunnie Lee Kyeong (The Barberettes), Yoon San-ha (Astro), SinB (GFriend), Kang Hong-seok, Kim Ga-yeon, Baby Soul (Lovelyz), Yang Chi-seung

Episode 171

Episode 171 was broadcast on September 30, 2018. This marks the beginning of the Eighty-sixth Generation.

Episode 172

Episode 172 was broadcast on October 7, 2018.

87th Generation Mask King

Contestants: Song Yuvin (Myteen), Seola (Cosmic Girls), Go Se-won, Kang Sung-yeon, Christian Burgos

Episode 173

Episode 173 was broadcast on October 14, 2018. This marks the beginning of the Eighty-seventh Generation.

Episode 174

Episode 174 was broadcast on October 21, 2018.

88th Generation Mask King

Contestants:  (Rainbow), Lee Dae-hwi (Wanna One), Shorry J (Mighty Mouth), Lee Ki-chan, Ravi (VIXX), Ra.D

Episode 175

Episode 175 was broadcast on October 28, 2018. This marks the beginning of the Eighty-eighth Generation.

Episode 176

Episode 176 was broadcast on November 4, 2018.

89th Generation Mask King

Contestants: Chun Myung-hoon (NRG), Jiyoung, Kwon Soon-il (Urban Zakapa), Kim Young-hee, Yuna (AOA), Donghyuk (iKon), Song Jae-hee, 

Episode 177

Episode 177 was broadcast on November 11, 2018. This marks the beginning of the Eighty-ninth Generation.

Episode 178

Episode 178 was broadcast on November 18, 2018.

90th Generation Mask King

Contestants: Lee So-jeong, Kim Ji-min, Jinyoung (Got7), Daegwang (Voisper), Lee Hyun, Moonbyul (Mamamoo)

Episode 179

Episode 179 was broadcast on November 25, 2018. This marks the beginning of the Ninetieth Generation.

Episode 180

Episode 180 was broadcast on December 2, 2018.

91st Generation Mask King

Contestants: Kim Kyung-ran, Shaun (The Koxx), Lee Jae-jin (F.T. Island), Ahn Da-eun (The Ade), Ahn Yu-jin (Iz One), Lim Ju-eun, 

Episode 181

Episode 181 was broadcast on December 9, 2018. This marks the beginning of the Ninety-first Generation.

Episode 182

Episode 182 was broadcast on December 16, 2018.

92nd Generation Mask King

Contestants: Na Sung-ho (Noel), Sangyeon (The Boyz), Choi Jung-hoon (Jannabi), Stella Jang, Jo Jung-chi, Lisa, 

Episode 183

Episode 183 was broadcast on December 23, 2018. This marks the beginning of the Ninety-second Generation.

Episode 184

Episode 184 was broadcast on December 30, 2018.

References 

Lists of King of Mask Singer episodes
Lists of variety television series episodes
Lists of South Korean television series episodes
2018 in South Korean television